Michael Falzon may refer to:

Michael Falzon (actor) (1972–2020), Australian actor
Michael Falzon (politician) (born 1961), member of the Maltese parliament